The 2021 Estoril Open is a men's tennis tournament played on outdoor clay courts. It is the 6th edition of the tournament and part of the ATP Tour 250 series of the 2021 ATP Tour. It tames place at the Clube de Ténis do Estoril in Cascais, Portugal, from 26 April through 2 May 2021. Seventh-seeded Albert Ramos Viñolas won the singles title.

Champions

Singles

  Albert Ramos Viñolas def.  Cameron Norrie, 4–6, 6–3, 7–6(7–3).

Doubles

  Hugo Nys /  Tim Pütz def.  Luke Bambridge /  Dominic Inglot, 7–5, 3–6, [10–3].

Points and prize money

Point distribution

Prize money 

*per team

Singles main draw entrants

Seeds

1 Rankings are as of 19 April 2021

Other entrants
The following players received wildcards into the main draw:
  Kei Nishikori
  Denis Shapovalov
  João Sousa

The following players received entry from the qualifying draw:
  Carlos Alcaraz
  Nuno Borges 
  Pedro Martínez
  Jaume Munar

The following player received entry as a lucky loser:
  Roberto Carballés Baena

Withdrawals 
Before the tournament
  Pablo Carreño Busta → replaced by  Kevin Anderson
  Fabio Fognini → replaced by  Pierre-Hugues Herbert
  Gaël Monfils → replaced by  Marco Cecchinato
  Kei Nishikori → replaced by  Roberto Carballés Baena
  Benoît Paire → replaced by  Fernando Verdasco
  Diego Schwartzman → replaced by  Juan Ignacio Londero

During the tournament
  Richard Gasquet

Retirements 
  Kevin Anderson

Doubles main draw entrants

Seeds

 Rankings are as of 19 April 2021

Other entrants
The following pairs received wildcards into the doubles main draw:
  Frederico Ferreira Silva /  Pedro Sousa
  Cameron Norrie /  João Sousa

Withdrawals 
Before the tournament
  Romain Arneodo /  Benoît Paire → replaced by  Nicholas Monroe /  Frances Tiafoe
  Marcel Granollers /  Horacio Zeballos → replaced by  Cristian Garín /  David Vega Hernández

References

External links
 Official website

 
2021